Pennsbury Inn, now known as Wild Wisteria, and formerly known as Lancaster Inn, and Hal-Dell Farm, is an historic inn and tavern located in Pennsbury Township, Chester County, Pennsylvania. It is a stone and brick structure dated to the early 18th century.  It operated initially as an inn and then a tavern until the late 19th century, after which it was remodeled into a two family dwelling.

It was added to the National Register of Historic Places in 1973 and converted to a Bed and Breakfast in 1999.

References

Hotel buildings on the National Register of Historic Places in Pennsylvania
Hotel buildings completed in 1759
Buildings and structures in Chester County, Pennsylvania
1789 establishments in Pennsylvania
National Register of Historic Places in Chester County, Pennsylvania